Fairview is a city in Brown County, Kansas, United States.  As of the 2020 census, the population of the city was 240.

History
Fairview was founded on October 27, 1886, on land purchased in 1872 by W. F. Lambertson. It was named for its scenic setting.

Geography
Fairview is located at  (39.839885, -95.727369).

Demographics

2010 census
As of the census of 2010, there were 260 people, 130 households, and 71 families living in the city. The racial makeup of the city was 93.8% White, 1.9% African American, 0.4% Native American, and 3.8% from two or more races. Hispanic or Latino of any race were 0.8% of the population.

There were 130 households, of which 16.9% had children under the age of 18 living with them, 45.4% were married couples living together, 9.2% had a female householder with no husband present, and 45.4% were non-families. 39.2% of all households were made up of individuals, and 15.4% had someone living alone who was 65 years of age or older. The average household size was 2.00 and the average family size was 2.69.

The median age in the city was 51.3 years. 17.3% of residents were under the age of 18; 5.3% were between the ages of 18 and 24; 16.1% were from 25 to 44; 36.1% were from 45 to 64; and 25% were 65 years of age or older. The gender makeup of the city was 49.6% male and 50.4% female.

2000 census
As of the census of 2000, there were 271 people, 132 households, and 71 families living in the city. The racial makeup of the city was 95.20% White, 3.32% African American, and 1.48% from two or more races. Hispanic or Latino of any race were 1.11% of the population.

There were 132 households, out of which 22.7% had children under the age of 18 living with them, 47.0% were married couples living together, 6.8% had a female householder with no husband present, and 46.2% were non-families. 45.5% of all households were made up of individuals, and 27.3% had someone living alone who was 65 years of age or older. The average household size was 2.05 and the average family size was 2.93.

In the city, the population was spread out, with 20.7% under the age of 18, 4.8% from 18 to 24, 24.4% from 25 to 44, 24.7% from 45 to 64, and 25.5% who were 65 years of age or older. The median age was 45 years. For every 100 females, there were 86.9 males. For every 100 females age 18 and over, there were 90.3 males.

The median income for a household in the city was $31,250, and the median income for a family was $51,607. Males had a median income of $33,333 versus $17,917 for females. The per capita income for the city was $22,789. About 11.0% of families and 9.7% of the population were below the poverty line, including 6.8% of those under the age of eighteen and 15.3% of those 65 or over.

Economy
Although Fairview is mostly a bedroom community to the employees and students of nearby Sabetha and Hiawatha, a few businesses thrive.  Services available from local business owners include welding, electrical, trash collection, and plumbing.  The Fairview Enterprise is the weekly paper, published in the same building since 1931.  The city has also successfully maintained a post office.

Fairview is also currently home to Curb Roller Manufacturing which does business worldwide.

Notable people
 David Floyd Lambertson, former United States Ambassador and Deputy Assistant Secretary of State in Southeast Asia
 William P. Lambertson, U.S. Representative from Kansas
 Bernard W. Rogers, former Supreme Allied Commander Europe (NATO)

See also
 Autovon

References

External links
 City of Fairview
 Fairview - Directory of Public Officials
 USD 415, local school district
 Fairview city map, KDOT

Cities in Kansas
Cities in Brown County, Kansas
1872 establishments in Kansas
Populated places established in 1872